Gerry Beaudoin is an American jazz guitarist who was a member of the New Guitar Summit with  Jay Geils and Duke Robillard.

Career
Beaudoin's father listened to Louis Armstrong, Count Basie, Andrés Segovia, and country music. Inspired by Chet Atkins and Johnny Cash, Beaudoin started playing guitar around the time he was ten-years-old. When he was fifteen, he began playing professionally with a country band. During the rest of high school, he played in blues bands, rock bands, and an Italian wedding band.

In 1972, he went to the Berklee College of Music in Boston. While visiting his sister in New York City, he saw performances by jazz guitarists Kenny Burrell, Jim Hall, Joe Puma, and Chuck Wayne. One night he saw Bucky Pizzarelli and was motivated to buy a seven-string guitar. Pizzarelli became a lifelong friend and mentor.

Beaudoin had the good fortune to work with two guitarists he admired when he was younger. In high school, he had seen a concert by blues guitarist Duke Robillard and Roomful of Blues that left a deep impression on him. During the 1980s, he worked with Roomful of Blues when it was led by Ronnie Earl and occasionally was accompanied by Jay McShann and Eddie Cleanhead Vinson. In high school, he was given the J. Geils Band's first album, which he tried to work out on guitar. In 1992, he met Jay Geils, who said he owned some of Beaudoin's albums. Years later, Beaudoin, Robillard, and Geils formed the New Guitar Summit, a swing trio with roots in the music of Charlie Christian and Benny Goodman. Their second album, Jazzthing II, featured guest performances by Randy Bachman.

Discography
 Minor Swing with David Grisman (North Star, 1992)
 Just Among Friends (Honest, 1998)
 New Guitar Summit with Jay Geils and Duke Robillard (Stony Plain, 2004)
 Jay Geils, Gerry Beaudoin, and the Kings of Strings Featuring Aaron Weinstein (Arbors, 2006)
 Shivers with Jay Geils and Duke Robillard (Stony Plain, 2008)

As guest
 I Like It When It Rains, Ronnie Earl (1990)
 B-3 Blues and Grooves, Ron Levy (1992)
 Jazzthing II, Randy Bachman (2007)
 Jay Geils Plays Jazz, Jay Geils (Stony Plain, 2005)
 Toe Tappin' Jazz, Jay Geils (North Star, 2009)

References

1954 births
American jazz guitarists
Living people
20th-century American guitarists